The Eli Banana Ribbon Society is the oldest secret society at the University of Virginia. Founded in 1878 as a way to encourage the fraternities to engage more directly in the life of the University, the aim of the society was to bring its members to leadership in the University community and to "create an association of congenial spirits among the students."

While initially successful in dominating various student organizations, including the Jefferson Society, the Football Board, and the social scene, the organization took on a more lax tone over the succeeding years and became most famous for its "bacchanalian" Easter parades with which the elections of new members were marked. The early period of the society was ultimately marked with its censure by the faculty in 1894, when the faculty demanded that the members sever their ties with the organization in writing and pledge not to rejoin, or forfeit their diplomas. The group was later reconstituted on direct appeal to the Board of Visitors.

Eli Banana has remained active since its reconstitution in 1897, most recently establishing the Eli Banana Fund, which has donated to various restoration and new building projects around the University since its inception in 2003.

Notable members of the society include University mathematics professor William "Reddy" Echols, hedge fund billionaire Paul Tudor Jones, and University Rector and Board of Visitors member Armistead C. Gordon.

External links
 The Mystic Order of Eli Banana

References

University of Virginia
Collegiate secret societies
Student societies in the United States
1878 establishments in Virginia
Student organizations established in 1878